Little Sutton is a village on the Wirral Peninsula, in the unitary authority of Cheshire West and Chester and the ceremonial county of Cheshire, England. Located between Childer Thornton and Great Sutton, it is a suburb of the town of Ellesmere Port. Little Sutton is mostly residential and sits either side of the A41 road, linking Birkenhead and Chester.

History
Little Sutton and neighbouring Great Sutton were mentioned in a single entry in the Domesday Book of 1086 as Sudtone, under the ownership of the canons of St Werburgh's Abbey.

The settlement was previously a township in the parish of Eastham, in the Wirral Hundred. A civil parish from 1866, it was abolished in 1950 and subsumed into Ellesmere Port. The population was recorded at 166 in 1801, 432 in 1851 and rising to 1,109 in 1901.

Geography
Little Sutton is in the southern part of the Wirral Peninsula and a suburban area of the town of Ellesmere Port.

Sports facilities
Hooton Lawn Tennis Club, which was established in 1912 but significantly rebuilt in 1999 and now provides its members with four artificial grass courts. 

Ellesmere Port Golf Club, part of the Ian Woosnam Golf Academy, is an 18 hole golf course with practice facilities and a fitness suite. A former resident professional was Dick Burton (1907-1974), Open Championship winner 1939, renowned as the longest reigning Open Champion due to World War II. The championship was not played again until 1946.

Little Sutton Bowling Club is a crown green bowling club, situated next to the public library on the A41

Religious sites
The Church of Saint Mary of the Angels, opened in 1879, is a Roman Catholic parish church in the Diocese of Shrewsbury. It is recorded in the National Heritage List for England as a designated Grade II listed building. 

St Paul's Church opened in 1862. It is an Anglican parish church in the deanery of Wirral South, the Archdeaconry of Chester and the Diocese of Chester. The church is recorded in the National Heritage List for England as a designated Grade II* listed building.

Little Sutton Methodist Church is associated with the Wirral Methodist Circuit. 

Dating from the 1830s, St George's United Reformed Church closed in 2020. The building was sold for redevelopment in 2021.

Public houses

Pubs in Little Sutton include Alfie's Bistro & Wine Bar, the Olde Red Lion, the Traveller's Rest and The Cheshire Yeoman. The Olde Red Lion near the junction of Chester Road (A41) and Station Road (B5463) dates from about 1850. The original building was demolished in 1934 and re-sited further east to enable road widening.  

Other nearby pubs are The Chimneys in Hooton and The Halfway House and The White Lion in Childer Thornton.

Transport
Little Sutton Railway Station is on the Wirral line of the Merseyrail network. Trains run every 30 minutes to Ellesmere Port and Liverpool Central. 

Seven bus routes serve Little Sutton:

See also
Sutton Hall, Little Sutton

References

Villages in Cheshire
Areas of Ellesmere Port